Cashew Research Station, Madakkathara is a research Station under the Central Zone of Kerala Agricultural University at Madakkathara in Thrissur district of Kerala, India. This research Station was established in 1973. It is one of the ten centres of All India Coordinated Research Project on Cashew (AICRP on Cashew).

The main function of the centre is research on cashew. Madakkathara, the location of this station, is in the central agro climatic zone of Kerala with lateritic (oxisol) soil. The station is situated at an altitude of 40 Metres above MSL.

This research station established the first ever cashew apple processing unit in India. The processing unit produces five commercial food products from cashew apple such as cashew apple syrup, cashew apple-mango mixed jam (Cashewman Jam), cashew apple candy, cashew apple pickle and cashew apple ready-to-serve. In 2009 a delegation from Senegal in West Africa is underwent training in cashew cultivation and cashew apple processing at the Cashew Research Station.

In 2013, field tests for organic substitutes for Endosulfan conducted at this research station, yielded positive results.

Cashew cultivars released from this station

References

External links
 Official Website crsmadakkathara
 High Yielding Varieties of Cashew. Salam M.A., Mohanakumaran. N (1995). 

Agricultural research stations in Kerala
Cashew production in India
Education in Thrissur district
1973 establishments in Kerala
Research institutes established in 1973